Somatina sedata is a moth of the  family Geometridae. It is found in South Africa and on Madagascar.

References

Moths described in 1922
Scopulini